Frederick C. Smith was an English footballer who played in the English Football League for Port Vale.

Career
Smith joined Port Vale as an amateur in November 1925, signing professional forms in January 1926. His debut came on 5 April 1926 in a 2–0 defeat to Bradford City at Valley Parade, and he played one further game at the end of the 1925–26 season. However, after only making a further two Second Division appearances in 1926–27 he was released at the end of the season.

Career statistics
Source:

References

Year of birth missing
Year of death missing
Sportspeople from Stafford
English footballers
Association football wingers
Port Vale F.C. players
English Football League players